Hinkle is an unincorporated community in Alcorn County, Mississippi, United States.

History
Hinkle is named after a local family. A post office operated under the name Hinkle from 1881 to 1903.

References

Unincorporated communities in Alcorn County, Mississippi
Unincorporated communities in Mississippi